Noémi Poulin is a Canadian costume designer.

She is most noted for her work on the film Blood Quantum, for which she won the Canadian Screen Award for Best Costume Design at the 9th Canadian Screen Awards, and was a Prix Iris nominee for Best Costume Design at the 23rd Quebec Cinema Awards.

References

External links

Canadian costume designers
Canadian women artists
French Quebecers
Living people
Canadian women in film
Women costume designers
Best Costume Design Genie and Canadian Screen Award winners
Year of birth missing (living people)